Julius H. Stahel-Számwald (born Gyula Számwald; November 5, 1825 – December 4, 1912) was a Hungarian soldier who emigrated to the United States and became a Union general in the American Civil War. After the war, he served as a U.S. diplomat, a mining engineer, and a life insurance company executive. He received the Medal of Honor for gallantry in action at the Battle of Piedmont in 1864.

Birth and early years
Stahel was born in Szeged, Kingdom of Hungary, 200 km southeast of Budapest. After schooling in Szeged and Budapest, he entered the Austrian Army, rising to the rank of lieutenant. Stahel joined the movement for Hungarian independence led by Lajos Kossuth during the Revolution of 1848. He served on the staffs of Gen. Artúr Görgey and Gen. Richard Debaufre Guyon. When the Hungarian uprising against the Habsburg dynasty was put down in 1849, he fled to Prussia and then to England before migrating to the United States in 1859. Until the outbreak of the American Civil War, he worked for Deutsche illustrirte Familienblätter, a German-language newspaper in New York City.

Civil War service
In 1861, with the outbreak of war, Stahel and Louis Blenker recruited the 8th New York Volunteer Infantry Regiment, the 1st German Rifles or Blenker's Rifles. Stahel, who had dropped the "Számwald" portion of his surname, became the regiment's lieutenant colonel, while Blenker served as colonel. Stahel first saw combat at the First Battle of Bull Run, leading the regiment in Blenker's first brigade of Dixon Miles's Fifth Division. The regiment covered the flight of the Union Army of Brig. Gen. Irvin McDowell. The 8th New York served in Blenker's division of the newborn Army of the Potomac until it was transferred to western Virginia. Stahel become a colonel on August 11, 1861 and a brigadier general three months later.

Stahel led a brigade under Maj. Gen. John C. Fremont in the Mountain Department during an incursion into the Shenandoah Valley of Virginia. His brigade was of Fremont's left at the Battle of Cross Keys in which Stonewall Jackson stopped the Union advance into the Valley. Stahel's position on the left exposed his command to a flank attack by Isaac Trimble's brigade as Fremont was attempting to turn the right of the Confederate line.

By July 1862, Stahel was commander of the first brigade of Robert C. Schenck's first division Army of Virginia in the corps led by Franz Sigel in Maj. Gen. John Pope's Army of Virginia. At the Second Battle of Bull Run, Schenck was wounded and Stahel became acting commander of the division. (Adolphus Buschbeck succeeded to command of the brigade.) Stahel's brigade was one of two that covered Sigel's retreat when Pope's army was defeated.

Stahel rose to division command by late 1862 and was promoted to major general on March 14, 1863. He briefly commanded the XI Corps during the fall of 1862.

In March 1863 Stahel was assigned to command a Union cavalry division in the defenses of Washington, D.C. When the division joined the Army of the Potomac in June 1863, Alfred Pleasonton had Stahel removed, promoting Judson Kilpatrick in his place. He then served as cavalry commander in the Department of the Susquehanna at the time of the Gettysburg Campaign.

By the spring of 1864, Stahel was commander of the 1st Cavalry Division under Franz Sigel in the Shenandoah Valley. At the Battle of New Market, on May 15, 1864, his division was on the left of Sigel's line. It attacked the Confederate line but was repulsed by artillery fire. The division recoiled under attack by the Confederate forces of John C. Breckinridge when they counterattacked.

At the Battle of Piedmont on June 5, 1864, serving as cavalry commander under Maj. Gen. David Hunter, Stahel distinguished himself under fire until he was hit in the shoulder. This led to Stahel's receiving the Medal of Honor, on November 4, 1893, for leading his division until seriously wounded. Stahel served, after recovering from his wound, on court-martial duty until he resigned on February 8, 1865.

Postbellum career
After the Civil War, Stahel served in the United States diplomatic corps as consul in Yokohama, (1866–1869) and Osaka, Japan (1877–1884). After that he was United States Consul General in Shanghai, China (1884–1885). Between diplomatic assignments, he worked as a mining engineer. Upon returning to the United States for reasons of health, Stahel worked for the Equitable Life Insurance Company in New York City. 

Stahel died in a New York City at 87 years of age. After a funeral in Washington, he was buried in the Arlington National Cemetery.

Medal of Honor citation
Rank and organization: Major General, U.S. Volunteers. Place and date: At Piedmont, Va., June 5, 1864. Entered service at: New York, N.Y. Born: November 5, 1825, Hungary. Date of issue: November 4, 1893.

Citation:

Led his division into action until he was severely wounded.

See also

List of Medal of Honor recipients
List of American Civil War Medal of Honor recipients: Q–S
List of American Civil War generals (Union)

Notes

References

 Eicher, John H., and Eicher, David J., Civil War High Commands, Stanford University Press, 2001, .
 Engle, Stephen Douglas, The Yankee Dutchman : the life of Franz Sigel, Fayetteville : University of Arkansas Press, 1993.
 Hennessy, John J., Return to Bull Run: The Campaign and Battle of Second Manassas, University of Oklahoma Press, 1993, .
 Patchan, Scott C., The Battle of Piedmont, Virginia, Fredericksburg: Sgt. Kirkland's Press, 1996.
 
 

1835 births
1912 deaths
People from Szeged
Burials at Arlington National Cemetery
Hungarian emigrants to the United States
Union Army generals
Military personnel from New York City
People of New York (state) in the American Civil War
United States Army Medal of Honor recipients
Forty-Eighters
Foreign-born Medal of Honor recipients
Hungarian Jews
American Civil War recipients of the Medal of Honor
Hungarian-born Medal of Honor recipients
Consuls general of the United States in Shanghai